Mesa County Valley School District 51 is a school district in Mesa County, Colorado, United States. It is the tenth largest school district in the state. It comprises the Grand Junction area.

Elementary schools
 Broadway Elementary 
 Chatfield Elementary 
 Chipeta Elementary 
 Clifton Elementary 
 Columbine Elementary 
 Dos Rios Elementary 
 Dual Immersion Academy 
 Fruitvale Elementary 
 Lincoln Orchard Mesa Elementary 
 Lincoln Park Elementary 
 Loma Elementary 
 Mesa View Elementary 
 New Emerson Elementary 
 Nisley Elementary 
 Orchard Ave Elementary 
 Pear Park Elementary 
 Pomona Elementary 
 Rim Rock Elementary 
 Rocky Mountain Elementary 
 Scenic Elementary 
 Shelledy Elementary 
 Taylor Elementary 
 Thunder Mountain Elementary 
 Tope Elementary 
 Wingate Elementary

Middle schools
 Bookcliff Middle School 
 East Middle School 
 Fruita Middle School 
 Grand Mesa Middle School 
 Mount Garfield Middle School 
 Orchard Mesa Middle School 
 Redlands Middle School 
 West Middle School

High schools
Central High School 
Fruita Monument High School 
Grand Junction High School 
Palisade High School 
R-5 High School

Special schools
 Caprock Academy (K-7 charter school 
 Career Center (alternative program) 
 DYC (alternative program)
 Gateway (K-12 school) 
 Grand River Academy (k-12 Virtual School) [47]
 Independence Academy (charter school) 
 The Opportunity Center (alternative program) 
 School Without Walls (alternative program)
 Valley School East (alternative program) 
 Valley School West (alternative program) 
 Young Parent (alternative program)
 WCCC (alternative program)

References

External links
 

Education in Mesa County, Colorado
School districts in Colorado